Moumou is a 1951 French comedy film directed by René Jayet and starring Robert Murzeau, Nathalie Nattier and Jeannette Batti. It was adapted by Jean de Letraz from his own 1944 play of the same title.

The film's sets were designed by the art director Aimé Bazin.

Cast
 Robert Murzeau as Léonard Jolijoli
 Nathalie Nattier as 	Brigitte Latouche
 Jeannette Batti as Claudine
 Pierre-Louis as Armand Chauvinet
 Raymond Bussières as Jules Latouche
 Annette Poivre as Gisèle Chauvinet
 André Gabriello as 	Commissaire Germain
 Georgette Anys as La masseuse
 René Lacourt as 	L'habitué

References

Bibliography 
 Rège, Philippe. Encyclopedia of French Film Directors, Volume 1. Scarecrow Press, 2009.

External links 
 

1951 films
French comedy films
1951 comedy films
1950s French-language films
Films directed by René Jayet
French black-and-white films
French films based on plays
1950s French films